(Scottish Gaelic for 'long mountain') or Ben Attow is a mountain in the Scottish Highlands.

The finest route up  is from Morvich to the north-west. There is a direct line up a grassy, and rather boggy, slope from the east side of the River Croe. There is one short tricky section of downward scrambling on this ridge. An easy line of descent can be found, north-westwards from the summit, into Gleann Choinneachain. Total distance from Morvich is about 7 km, with around 1100 metres of ascent, including undulations.

Beinn Fhada has been dismissed by some guide writers as boring. It has two remarkable features: the Plaide Mor is the largest extent of ancient (preglacial) land surface to survive in the western Highlands, and is of Cairngorm character. Secondly, its SW slopes into Gleann Lichd are seamed for 3 km with trenches reaching 10m high and 800m long, a slope deformation that is the largest 'rock slope failure' in the Highlands.

References

Mountains and hills of the Northwest Highlands
Munros
Marilyns of Scotland
One-thousanders of Scotland